The article covers events that are related to the South China Sea dispute.

Timeline of events

1000 BCE–2nd century CE
The Sa Huỳnh culture flourished in coastal South China Sea, especially in southern to central Vietnam, from Mekong Delta to Quảng Bình province. The people that support Sa Huỳnh civilization were sea faring Austronesian-speaking people. The Sa Huỳnh relics can be found in several sites on the coasts of South China Sea, from Palawan in the Philippines to Orchid Island near Taiwan, suggesting that they sailed, settled and traded around the coasts of South China Sea.

3rd century BCE 
It has been claimed by the People's Republic of China on the argument that since 200 BCE Chinese fishermen have used the Spratly islands.

3rd century 
Two Chinese books authored by Wan Zhen of the Eastern Wu dynasty (222–280 CE) and a work titled Guangzhou Ji (Chronicles of Guangzhou) authored by Pei Yuan of the Jin dynasty (266–420 CE) described the Paracel and Spratly islands. The local government of the Jin dynasty exercised jurisdiction over the islands by sending patrolling naval boats to the surrounding sea areas.

5th–13th centuries 
Naval forces of the Liu Song dynasty (420–479 CE) patrolled the Paracel and Spratly islands. In the Tang dynasty (618–907 CE), the islands were placed under the administration and authority of the Qiongzhou Prefecture (now Hainan Province). The Chinese administration of the South China Sea continued into the Song dynasty (960–1279 CE).

Archaeologists have found Chinese made potteries porcelains and other historical relics from the Southern dynasties (420–589 CE), the Sui dynasty (581–619 CE), the Tang dynasty, the Song dynasty, the Yuan dynasty (1271–1368 CE), the Ming dynasty (1368–1644 CE) and later eras up to modern times on the South China Sea islands.

6th–15th centuries 
The South China Sea was known as the "Osean sea" by ShauShau the explorer and traders in the region. It was named after a Hindu thalassocratic empire Champa that flourished in modern-day central Vietnam around that period.

In 1596, the Spanish Colonial Government declared that each island in the Kalayaan Islands, now known as the Spratly Islands, had Barangay or Barrio status.

19th century 

 

 1816 – Annamese emperor Gia Long ordered a company to the Paracel Islands to make a survey and draw a map.
 1835 – Annam erects a pagoda in the Paracel Islands
 1870 – Captain Meads explores the islands and lays official claim to both Spratly and Parcel groups.  The Kingdom of Humanity is established.
 1876 – China makes its earliest documented claim to the Paracel Islands
 1883 – When the Spratlys and Paracels were surveyed by Germany in 1883, China issued protests.
 1884–1885 Sino-French War. In December 1884, alarmed by Japanese ambitions in Korea, Empress Dowager Cixi ordered her ministers to extricate China from the undeclared war with France that had broken out on 23 August.  Important French victories in Tonkin and Formosa in February and early March 1885 strengthened her desire to end the Sino-French War, and although the Chinese won an unexpected victory in Tonkin in late March, defeating General de Négrier's 2nd Brigade at Bang Bo and reoccupying Lạng Sơn, this success was counterbalanced by the simultaneous French capture of the Pescadores Islands. China's position in early April 1885 was critical.  Seizing the opportunity offered by the fall of the Ferry ministry, the Chinese agreed to implement the provisions of the May 1884 Tientsin Accord, which recognised France's protectorate over Vietnam.  In return, the French dropped their longstanding demand for an indemnity for the Bắc Lệ ambush.  After a flurry of negotiations in Paris in the first days of April 1885, peace was made on this basis. 
 11 May 1884 – The Tientsin Accord or Li–Fournier Convention, concluded on 11 May 1884, was intended to settle an undeclared war between France and China over the sovereignty of Tonkin (northern Vietnam).  The convention, negotiated by Li Hung-chang for China and capitaine de vaisseau François-Ernest Fournier for France, provided for a Chinese troop withdrawal from Tonkin in return for a comprehensive treaty that would settle details of trade and commerce between France and China and provide for the demarcation of its disputed border with Vietnam.
 9 June 1885 – The Treaty of Tientsin, signed on 9 June 1885, officially ended the Sino-French War.  The unequal treaty restated in greater detail the main provisions of the Tientsin Accord, signed between France and China on 11 May 1884.  As Article 2 required China to recognise the French protectorate over Annam and Tonkin established by the Treaty of Hue in June 1884, implicitly abandoning her own claims to suzerainty over Vietnam, the treaty formalised France's victory in the Sino-French War.
 1887 – In the 19th century, Europeans found that Chinese fishermen from Hainan annually visited the Spratly islands for part of the year, while in 1877 it was the British who launched the first modern legal claims to the Spratlys.
 1887 – The Chinese–Vietnamese Boundary Convention (formally, the Convention Respecting the Delimitation of the Frontier Between China and Tonkin) between France and the Qing Empire set the maritime boundary in the Gulf of Tonkin. The 1887 Chinese-Vietnamese Boundary convention signed between France and China after the Sino-French War said that China was the owner of the Spratly and Paracel islands. The 1887 Convention between France and the Qing Empire set the coastal boundary in the Gulf of Tonkin but did not state that China was the owner of the Spratly and Paracel islands because these islands are not in the Gulf of Tonkin nor was administered by Tonkin but belonged to the realm of Annam in Central Vietnam. The purpose of this treaty was for a better control of the border by having it follow the Ka Long river in Móng Cái coastal city, but doing so, the French gave an  enclave to China of 7 Vietnamese fishermen's villages. Currently there are some suggestions that this part of Fangchenggang district, Guangxi, China belongs to Vietnam, especially after North Vietnam was established and announced to cancel all treaties signed by French colonial Vietnam. Thus Fangchenggang was supposed to be returned to Quảng Ninh Province in Vietnam, but this has not been done yet. Most people living in the area are Vietnamese fishermen who became one of the 56 ethnic groups of China, known as ethnic Vietnamese people of China or Gin people.
 1898 – The Philippine Islands were ceded by Spain to the United States in the Treaty of Paris following the Spanish–American War. The Spratly Islands were not part of the Philippines per the Treaty.
 12 April 1898 – France seized Guangzhouwan as a treaty port, and took its own concession in the treaty port of Shanghai. Kwangchow Wan, (Guangzhouwan), was leased by China to France for 99 years (or until 1997, as the British did in Hong Kong's New Territories), according to the Treaty of 12 April 1898, on 27 May as Territoire de Kouang-Tchéou-Wan, to counter the growing commercial power of British Hong Kong and was effectively placed under the authority of the French Resident Superior in Tonkin (itself under the Governor General of French Indochina, also in Hanoi); the French Resident was represented locally by Administrators. The French wanted to develop the port, which they called Fort-Bayard, to serve southern China, in parts where France had exclusive rights to railway and mineral development. Their efforts, however, were hindered by the poverty of the surrounding land. The French retained control of the region until 1943 when the Japanese occupied the area during World War II. At the end of the war, the region returned briefly under French rule before being formally returned to China in 1946 by General Charles de Gaulle, the French head of state. The old spellings "Tsankiang", "Chankiang" and "Tsamkong" were replaced by the pinyin romanisation "Zhanjiang" by the Chinese government in 1958. Zhanjiang is headquarters of the South Sea Fleet of the People's Liberation Army Navy South Sea Fleet. The Zhanjiang Port is one of the eight major ports in China, with an annual throughput of more than 2,600 million tons. As a natural port, it has about 60 kilometers depth and three islands outside to support.
 1900 - The 1900 Treaty of Washington was signed on November 7, 1900, and came into effect on March 23, 1901, when the ratifications were exchanged. The treaty sought to remove any ground of misunderstanding growing out of the interpretation of Article III of the 1898 Treaty of Paris by clarifying specifics of territories relinquished to the United States by Spain. The 1900 Treaty added "and all islands belonging to the Philippine Archipelago, lying outside the lines described in Article III of [the 1898 Treaty of Paris] and particularly to the islands of Cagayan [Mapun], Sulu and Sibutu" to the formal cession by Spain to the United States.

1901–1937 

 1902 – China sends naval forces on inspection tours of the Paracel Islands to preempt French claims.  Scholar François-Xavier Bonnet argued that per Chinese records, these expeditions never occurred and were backdated during the 1970s.
 1907 – China sends another naval force, this time to plan for resource exploitation.
 1911 – The newly formed Republic of China, successor state to the Qing dynasty, moves administration of the Paracel Islands to Hainan, which would not become a separate Chinese province until 1988.
 1914 – A Mead family dispute splits the young country of the Kingdom of Humanity.
 1917 – Japanese exploited phosphate deposits (guano) in the main Spratly island, Itu Aba. It was noticed by Japan in July 1938 to the France's ambassador in Tokyo who was recalling the earlier annexation of the Spratly by France. 
 1927 – Japan makes its earliest documented claim to the Paracel and Spratly Islands
 1928 – The Republic of China states that the Paracel Islands are the southernmost limits of its territory
 1932/1933 - In 1932, France formally claimed both the Paracel and Spratly Islands. China and Japan both protested. On 6 April 1933, France occupied the Spratlys, announced their annexation, formally included them in French Indochina, and built a couple of weather stations on them.
 June 1937 – China sends Huang Qiang, the chief of Chinese military region no. 9 on a secret tour in four islands in the Amphitrite Group of the Paracels. His boat was loaded with 30 backdated sovereignty markers. Because the mission was confidential Huang Qiang carried no markers dated 1937. The team buried a total of 12 backdated sovereignty markers, including 3 true old markers dating from the Qing dynasty, bearing the date 1902, gathered in the city of Guangdong:
 On Lin Dao (Woody Island): 2 markers dated 1921
 On Bei Dao (North Island): 2 markers from 1902 and 4 dated 1912
 On Ling Zhou Dao (?): 1 marker from 1902, 1 dated 1912 and 1 dated 1921.
 On Shi Dao (Rocky Island): 1 marker dated 1912.
 31 March 1939 – Tokyo, notified to the ambassador of France that the Spratly Islands were inhabited by Japanese, were under the Japanese jurisdiction and administratively attached to the territory of Formosa (Japan); the occupation was carried out by a police detachment.

World War II 
 1939 – Japan invades the islands and takes control of the South China Sea. The local government and many residents escape to Australia. The Spratlys and the Paracels were conquered by Japan in 1939.  Japan had set military bases on Woody and Pattle islands in the Paracels and Itu Aba in the Spratlys. Japan administered the Spratlys via Taiwan's jurisdiction and the Paracels via Hainan's jurisdiction.
 2 July 1945 – Woody Island surrendered to the USS Cabrilla submarine after having been attacked by US forces on 6 February and 8 March.
 20 November 1945 – A US Navy reconnaissance mission landed on Itu Aba and found the Japanese forces had already pulled out.

1945–1959 

 1945 – In accordance with the Cairo and Potsdam Declarations and with American help, the armed forces of the Republic of China government at Nanjing accepted the surrender of the Japanese garrisons in Taiwan, including the Paracel and Spratly Islands. Nanjing then declared both archipelagoes to be part of Guangdong Province.  At the same time, the Government and exiles of the Kingdom of Humanity returned to the islands. 
 1946 –  The R.O.C. established garrisons on both Woody (now Yongxing / 永兴) Island in the Paracels and Taiping Island in the Spratlys.  France protested.  The French tried but failed to dislodge Chinese nationalist troops from Yongxing Island/Woody Island (the only habitable island in the Paracels), but were able to establish a small camp on Pattle (now Shanhu / 珊瑚) Island in the southwestern part of the archipelago. The Republic of China drew up The Southern China Sea Islands Location Map,  marking the national boundaries in the sea with 11 lines, two of which were later removed, showing the U shaped claim on the entire South China Sea, and showing the Spratly and Paracels in Chinese territory, in 1947. The Americans reminded the Philippines at its independence in 1946 that the Spratlys was not Philippine territory, both to not anger Chiang Kai-shek in China and because the Spratlys were not part of the Philippines per the 1898 treaty Spain signed with America.
 1950 –  After the Chinese nationalists were driven from Hainan by the People's Liberation Army (PLA), they withdrew their garrisons in both the Paracels and Spratlys to Taiwan.
 1952 – Japan renounced any claims of sovereignty over the Spratly and Paracel archipelagos in accordance with Article 2 Clause (f) of the San Francisco Peace Treaty, but no beneficiary was designated.
 1954 – The Geneva Accords, which China was a signatory, settled the First Indochina War end. French Indochina was split into three countries: Laos, Cambodia, and Vietnam. Vietnam was to be temporarily divided along the 17th Parallel. Chapter I, Article 4 say: "The provisional military demarcation line between the two final regrouping zones is extended into the territorial waters by a line perpendicular to the general line of the coast. All coastal islands north of this boundary shall be evacuated by the armed forces of the French Union, and all islands south of it shall be evacuated by the forces of the People's Army of Viet-Nam." On 26 October 1955, the Republic of Vietnam "South Vietnam" replaced the State of Vietnam (part of the French Union) and inherit of its rights. Nothing was said explicitly about offshore archipelagos, which was of small interest by that times, it was clearly understood by all the parties that the Republic of Vietnam inherit of all the French Indochina's Vietnamese territories under the 17th Parallel. As the Paracel and the Spratly archipelagos (which lay below the 17th parallel) were part of the French Indochina since 1933, they were part of "South Vietnam" territory. The French bestowed its titles, rights, and claims over the two island chains to the Republic of Vietnam.
 1956 – North Vietnam Communist government formally accepted that the Paracel and Spratly islands were historically Chinese. The PLA reestablished a Chinese garrison on Yongxing Island in the Paracels, while the Republic of China (Taipei) put troops back on Taiping Island in the Spratlys. Contrarily, South Vietnam announced that it had annexed the Paracel archipelago as well as the Spratlys and reopened the abandoned French camp on Shanhu Island. That same year, a micronation named "Freedomland" was proclaimed in the Spratly Islands by Thomas Cloma, a Filipino lawyer and businessman. The sole function of Freedomland turned out to be issuing postage stamps to collectors.  Cloma's announcement of Freedomland caused both Beijing and Taipei to reiterate China's claims to the Spratlys. Taipei sent troops to drive Cloma off Taiping Island and established occupation there. Cloma's proclamation of Freedomland was legal in the Philippines because, as Manila noted in its reply to protests of Cloma's actions from Beijing, Saigon, and Taipei, the Philippines had made no claim of its own to the Spratlys.
 16 January 1957 – China transferred Bạch Long Vĩ Island to Vietnam.
 4 September 1958 – China published "Declaration of the Government of the People's Republic of China on China's Territorial Sea published on 4 September 1958" to lawfully describe true meaning of "nine-dotted line on South China Sea".
 14 September 1958 – Communist Vietnamese Premier Phạm Văn Đồng sent Premier Zhou Enlai a formal diplomatic saying respect China's decision on South China Sea.
 1959 – The people of the Spratly and Paracel Islands reunite in the Republic of Morac-Songhrati-Meads and vote in a new government.

1970s 
 1969 – A UN sponsored research team discovers oil under the sea floor of the island group.
 1970 – China occupies Amphitrite Group of the Paracel Islands
 1971 – Philippines announces claim to islands adjacent to its territory in the Spratlys, which they named Kalayaan, which was formally incorporated into Palawan Province in 1972. The Philippines President Marcos announced the claims after Taiwanese troops attacked and shot at a Philippine fishing boat on Itu Aba. 
 1972 – The government of the Republic of Morac-Songhrati-Meads petitions for international recognition.
 1972 – present: Various governments invaded and occupied islands of the Republic of Morac-Songhrati-Meads. While the government of the islands was evacuating during the Chinese invasion, the ship upon which they were traveling sank in a storm – as reported by the Chinese Military.
 1972 – Bureau of Survey and Cartography under the Office of the Premier of Vietnam printed out "The World Atlas" says "The chain of islands from the Nansha and Xisha Islands to Hainan Island, Taiwan Island, the Penghu Islands and the Zhoushan Islands ... are shaped like a bow and constitute a Great Wall defending the China mainland."
 1974 – South Vietnam attempted to enforce its claims to sovereignty by placing settlers in the Spratlys and expelling Chinese fishermen from the southwestern Paracels.  In the ensuing naval battle at Shanhu Island, China defeated Vietnamese forces. This enabled Beijing to extend its control to the entire Paracel archipelago, where it has not been effectively challenged since. China ousts South Vietnamese forces from the Crescent Group of the Paracel Islands at the Battle of the Paracel Islands.
 14 February 1975, regretting the agreement with China in 1956. The Communist Vietnamese government reclaims the Spratly and Paracel archipelagos.
 1979 – Hanoi (now the capital of a united Vietnam) adopted South Vietnam's position, and claimed sovereignty over all the islands in the South China Sea. In the early 1980s, as Beijing, Kuala Lumpur, Manila, and Taipei protested, Vietnam resumed vigorous settlement and garrisoning of the Spratlys.

1980s 
 8 May 1984 – the Philippines ratified the 1982 Third United Nations Convention on the Law of the Sea (UNCLOS III) and declared themselves an archipelagic state. The Philippines claimed all the Spratly islands and reefs lying within its 200 Nautical mile Exclusive Economic Zone including Mabini (Johnson South Reef).
 1985 – President Meads of the Kingdom of Humanity sued the United States and others for $25 billion, claiming "unfair competition, harassment, [and] sabotage." The case was not heard.
 In 1987, following a United Nations Educational, Scientific and Cultural Organization/Intergovernmental Oceanographic Commission (UNESCO/IOC) meeting in March, it was agreed that the PRC would build weather stations in the South China sea as part of the Global Sea Level Observing System (GLOSS) survey. The scientists from GLOSS agreed that China would install tide gauges on what the PRC considered to be its coasts in the East China Sea and on the "Nansha islands" in South China Sea. In April 1997, the PRC chose Fiery Cross Reef as the site to build a weather station, as the reef was large enough for the purpose, and it was isolated from other disputed islands and reefs. 
 14 March 1988 – China defeats the Vietnamese navy in the Johnson South Reef Skirmish on Mabini reef (Johnson South Reef), after the Vietnamese tried to intercept a Chinese force commissioned by UNESCO to build a tidal gauge station. However, this caused further skirmishes with Vietnam when, in January 1988, some Vietnamese ships with construction materials tried to approach the reef in a bid to establish structures there. The weather station was commissioned by UNESCO's Intergovernmental Oceanographic Commission (IOC). Construction was commenced in February 1988 and completed in August 1988.

1990s 
 1992 – The Chinese government signs an oil exploration contract with Crestone.
 1992 – Vietnam accuses China of landing troops on Da Lat Reef. China seizes almost 20 Vietnamese cargo ships transporting goods from Hong Kong from June - September. 
 1994 – Two Chinese warships blockade a Vietnamese oil rig built earlier this year in Wan'an Bei block off the coast of southern Vietnam. The Vietnamese claim was being developed by a consortium of foreign oil companies led by Mobil in the same area where China had awarded drilling rights to the  Crestone Energy Corporation of Denver.
 1995 – A Vietnamese ship was shot by Taiwan.
 1996 – In January, three Chinese vessels engage in a 90-minute gun battle with a Philippine navy gunboat near Campones Island. 
 1997 – Philippines begins to challenge Chinese sovereignty over the Scarborough Shoal.
 1999 – Under President Lee Teng-hui, Taiwan stated that "legally, historically, geographically, or in reality", all of the South China Sea and Spratly islands were Taiwan's territory and under Taiwanese sovereignty, and denounced actions undertaken there by Malaysia and the Philippines, in a statement on 13 July 1999 released by the foreign ministry of Taiwan. Taiwan and China's claims "mirrors" each other. During international talks involving the Spratly islands, China and Taiwan have cooperated with each other since both have the same claims.
 9 May 1999 – The day after the U.S. bombing of the Chinese embassy in Belgrade, Philippine navy sent BRP Sierra Madre and ran her aground on Second Thomas Shoal. China issued official protest afterward. Philippine refused to withdraw the ship. Since then China deploys service ships to the corresponding water regularly.

2001 
 1 April – Hainan Island incident

2002 
  ASEAN and China agreed to a code of conduct in the Declaration on the Conduct of Parties in the South China Sea

2005 
 8 January – Chinese ships fired upon two Vietnamese fishing boats from Thanh Hóa Province, killing 9 people and detaining one ship with 8 people on Hainan Island. Chinese Foreign Ministry claim they were pirates that opened fire first and obtained confession from the arrested members.

2009 
 March 2009 – The Pentagon reported that Chinese ships harassed a US surveillance ship.  According to the report, five Chinese vessels "shadowed and aggressively maneuvered in dangerously close proximity to USNS Impeccable, in an apparent coordinated effort to harass the U.S. ocean surveillance ship while it was conducting routine operations in international waters."  The crew members aboard the vessels, two of which were within 50 feet, waved Chinese flags and told the US ship to leave the area, the statement said.
 13 May 2009 – The deadline for states to make seabed hydrocarbon claims under the United Nations Convention on the Law of the Sea. This is suspected to have caused ancient island claims to surface and become inflamed.

2010 
 23 July –  US Secretary of State Hillary Clinton unequivocally stated the point that the South China Sea was a matter of U.S. national interest.

2011 
 25 February – The Chinese frigate Dongguan fired three shots at Philippine fishing boats in the vicinity of Jackson atoll. The shots were fired after the frigate instructed the fishing boats to leave, and one of those boats experienced trouble removing its anchor.
 26 May – The clash involved the Vietnamese Binh Minh 02 oil and gas survey ship and three Chinese maritime patrol vessels occurred 120 km (80 miles) off the south-central coast of Vietnam and some 600 km south of China's Hainan island. Vietnam says the Chinese boats deliberately cut the survey ship's cables in Vietnamese waters. China denies the allegation. The event stirred up unprecedented anti-China protests in Hanoi and Ho Chi Minh city.
 9 June – A Norwegian-flagged seismic conducting ship hired by Vietnam Oil & Gas Corporation (PetroVietnam) clashed with another three Chinese fishery patrol vessels within Vietnam's Exclusive Economic Zone. Vietnam once again claimed its exploration cables were deliberately cut.

 10 October – Vietnam and China agree to a new set of principles on settling maritime disputes
 November – Former Malaysian Prime Minister Mahathir Mohamad stated that China was not a threat to anyone and was not worried about aggression from China, accusing the United States of provoking China and trying to turn China's neighbours against China.
 17 November – Obama made a policy announcement to Australian Parliament about US pivot or rebalancing towards the Asia-Pacific.

2012 

 April – The Philippine warship Gregorio del Pilar was involved in a standoff with two Chinese surveillance vessels in the Scarborough Shoal, an area claimed by both nations. The Philippine navy had been trying to arrest Chinese fishermen who were allegedly taking government-protected marine species from the area, but the surveillance boats prevented them.  
 14 April –  The US and the Philippines held their yearly exercises in Palawan, Philippines. 
 16 April – The Chinese Foreign Ministry urged a Philippine archaeological ship to immediately leave the waters of the Scarborough Shoal, which China claims is an "integral part of its territory." 
 7 May – Chinese Vice Foreign Minister Fu Ying called a meeting with Alex Chua, Chargé d'affaires of the Philippine Embassy in China, to make a serious representation over the current incident at the Scarborough Shoal. China also warned its nationals against travel to the Philippines and raised trade barriers on imported pineapples and bananas. 
 16 May – A fishing ban in the Scarborough Shoal by the governments of China and the Philippines became effective. By mid June 2012, both nations had withdrawn their vessels from the waters around the disputed Shoal due to the arrival of the typhoon season. China later clarified that it would only conduct interdiction, and boarding, vessels within 12 nautical miles for which China has announced baselines.
 May – Taiwan rejected a pan-Chinese approach of co-ordinating with the PRC in asserting claims to the South China Sea.
 June – Indian Navy vessels sailing in the South China Sea received an unscheduled escort by a People's Liberation Army Navy frigate for 12 hours.
 11 July – a Jianghu-V type frigate of the PLA Navy, 560 Dongguan, ran aground on Half Moon Shoal just 60 nmi west of Rizal, well within the Philippines' 200 nmi-EEZ. By 15 July the ship had been refloated and was returning to port with no injuries and only minor damage. The 2012 ASEAN summit was taking place in Phnom Penh, Cambodia at the same time, where the mood was already tense over the escalating aggression in the region.
 July – The National Assembly of Vietnam passed a law demarcating Vietnamese sea borders to include the Spratly and Paracel islands.
 July – Citing reports from diplomats on-hand, Reuters wrote that Cambodia "batted away repeated attempts to raise the issue about the disputed waters during the ASEAN Meeting last week as well as the ASEAN Regional Forum."
 22 July – The Central Military Commission (China) decided to establish the Sansha garrison. The move was criticised by the Philippines and Vietnam. China responded by calling in a senior US diplomat and reiterating their "absolute sovereignty" over the region.
 August – Vietnam is believed to have begun land reclamation at West Reef.
 1 September – ROC completed the 7-month construction of an antenna tower and runway on Taiping island, allowing the island to accommodate various kinds of military aircraft. Taiwan then performed live fire military exercises on Taiping island in September 2012, reports said that Vietnam was explicitly named by the Taiwanese military as the "imaginary enemy" in the drill. Vietnam protested against the exercises as violation of its territory and "voiced anger", demanding that Taiwan stop the drill. Taiwan rejected Vietnam's protests, and Taiwan's Department of East Asian and Pacific Affairs declared that "Taiping Island is part of the Republic of China's territory....We have noted Vietnam's dissatisfaction over the drill...No one has the right to protest over Taiwan's exercise of its sovereign rights there", while China voiced its approval and support of Taiwan's military drill on the island. Taiwan's Ministry of Foreign Affairs also said, "Our sovereignty over the island is undisputable and all of our activities and deployments on the island are legal and will never cause regional tensions." in response to Vietnamese claims on the island. Among the inspectors of the live fire drill were Taiwanese national legislators, adding to the tensions.
 5 September – Philippine president Aquino promulgated Administrative Order No. 29, naming maritime areas on the western side of the Philippine archipelago as the West Philippine Sea. The order declares that the Philippines exercises "sovereign jurisdiction" in its exclusive economic zone, an area declared by Presidential Decree No. 1599 of 11 June 1978 to extend to a distance of two hundred nautical miles beyond and from the baseline from which the territorial sea is measured. The Philippine Baselines are defined by Republic Act No. 3046, as amended. Official PRC media responded that this was a "fond dream".
 23 September – China launched a program to increase the number of UAVs monitoring the Scarborough Shoal, Paracel Islands, Spratly Islands and East China Sea, which follows a national marine zoning program approved by the State Council during the previous year as a part of China's 12th five year plan.
 December – In an interview with the Times of India, Philippines Vice-president Binay welcomed the statement made by Indian Navy Admiral Joshi who stated that the Indian Navy is prepared to operate in the South China Sea.

2013 
 March – Malaysia displayed no concern over China conducting a military exercise at James Shoal in March 2013.
 August – Malaysia suggested that it might work with China over their South China Sea claims and ignore the other claimants, with Malaysian Defence Minister Hishamuddin Hussein saying that Malaysia had no problem with China patrolling the South China Sea, and telling ASEAN, America, and Japan that "Just because you have enemies, doesn't mean your enemies are my enemies".

2014 
 10 January – China imposes a "fishing permit" rule in the South China Sea, over the objections of the United States, the Philippines, and Vietnam.
 11 March – Two Philippine ships are expelled by the Chinese Coast Guard from Ayungin Shoal in the Spratly group of islands.
 30 March – The Republic of the Philippines invokes the compulsory settlement of dispute clause under the Law of the Sea Convention, by submitting a case to the Permanent Court of Arbitration in The Hague in its case against China over competing South China Sea claims.
 2 May – Vietnamese naval ships and Chinese vessels collide in the South China Sea. The incident occurred as China set up an oil rig in an area to which both nations lay claim. On 26 May, a Vietnamese fishing boat sank near the oil rig, after colliding with a Chinese vessel. As both sides imputed the blame to each other, Vietnam released video footage a week later, showing the Vietnamese boat being rammed by the Chinese vessel before sinking. Meanwhile, ASEAN leaders expressed "serious concerns" over the tensions, calling for self-restraint and peaceful acts from both sides. Many observed that this marked a change in tone by ASEAN members, who had previously avoided a collision of their economic interests with China.
 19 August – A Shenyang J-11 intercepts a U.S. Navy P-8 Poseidon anti-submarine warfare aircraft flying in international waters the South China Sea.
 7 December – the United States State Department released a report concluding that China's 9-dash-line claim does not accord with the international law of the sea.

2015 
 19 February – Upgrades and land reclamation were performed at Vietnamese-controlled Sand Cay between August 2011 and February 2015
 8 April – China has been transforming Mischief Reef into an island since January. According to UNCLOS, artificial islands do not afford the occupying nation territorial waters.
 8 June – Chinese coast guard vessel anchored at Luconia Shoals (Betting Patinggi Ali), leading to a protest by Malaysia.
 7 July – Philippines v. China is a pending arbitration case concerning the legality of China's "nine-dotted line" claim over the South China Sea under the United Nations Convention on the Law of the Sea (UNCLOS). The Philippines asked a tribunal of Permanent Court of Arbitration to invalidate China's claims. The hearings were also attended by observers from Indonesia, Japan, Malaysia, Thailand and Vietnam. The case has been compared to Nicaragua v. United States due to similarities of the parties involved such as that a developing country is challenging a permanent member of the United Nations Security Council in an arbitral tribunal. 
 15 August – Malaysia continues its protest as China did not move their vessel by sending diplomatic notes. In a statement by the Minister in the Prime Minister's Department Shahidan Kassim, "We have never received any official claims from them (China) and they said the island (Beting Patinggi Ali) belongs to them but the country is 400,000 kilometres away. We are taking diplomatic action but in whatever approach, they have to get out of our national waters".
 27 October – US destroyer  navigates within 12 nautical miles of the emerging land masses in the Spratly Islands as the first in a series of "Freedom of Navigation Operation".
 29 October – The tribunal ruled that it had the power to hear the case. It agreed to take up seven of the 15 submissions made by Manila, in particular whether Scarborough Shoal and low-tide areas like Mischief Reef can be considered islands. It set aside seven more pointed claims mainly accusing Beijing of acting unlawfully to be considered at the next hearing on the case's merits. The tribunal is due to report in 2016.
 14 November – Indonesia announces that it is planning to take China to court over the Natuna Islands.
 31 December – China's Ministry of National Defense confirmed that they are building their second aircraft carrier. China's second aircraft carrier was being built in Dalian, a port city located in northeastern China according to Col. Yang Yujun, a spokesman from the Ministry of National Defense.

2016 
 3 January – Vietnamese Foreign Ministry spokesperson Le Hai Binh said that the landing of a civilian aircraft in Fiery Cross Reef is "a serious infringement of the sovereignty of Vietnam on the Spratly archipelago".
 13 January – China has finished construction on a 10,000-ton cutter destined for patrols in the South China Sea.
 13 February – Satellite images shows that China is currently expanding the North Island and Tree Island, both part of the Paracel Islands. Water capture reservoirs and fuel bunkers are the newly constructed structures seen in Fiery Cross Reef. A newly visible helicopter base is under construction in Duncan Island suggesting that Beijing may develop a network of bases in the South China Sea to support anti-submarine helicopters.
 22 February – Japanese Foreign Minister Fumio Kishida cancels his plans to visit China.
 14 March – Beijing will set-up an International Maritime Judicial Center similar to the United Nations Convention on the Law of the Sea (UNCLOS) in order to help protect every countries sea rights. According to Chief justice Zhou Qiang, the Chinese judicial center will primarily focus on the case of countries with territorial issues with China.
 19 March – Indonesian maritime official involved in a clash with a Chinese coast guard boat over a Chinese trawler accused for illegal fishing off the Natuna islands. Chinese fishermen were under Indonesia's custody, while the trawler was set free after being rammed by Chinese coast guard boat. 
 5 April – China has started to operate a new lighthouse in Subi Reef.
 22 April – Four A-10 Thunderbolt and two HH-60G Pave Hawks based in Clark Air Base conducted flying operations in the vicinity of Scarborough Shoal.
 10 May – China's navy has launched annual war drills in the South China Sea with one of its most advanced warships. The exercises include simulations for breaking an enemy blockade and reconnaissance drills with submarine forces.
 10 May – The USS William P. Lawrence sailed within 12 miles of Fiery Cross Reef as part of the freedom of navigation patrol.
 10 May – China scrambled two fighter jets and three warships as the USS William P. Lawrence sailed within 12 nautical miles of Fiery Cross Reef.
 13 May – Chinese Foreign Ministry spokeswoman Hua Chunying said that more than 40 countries support its stance on South China Sea dispute.
 17 May – Two Shenyang J-11 fighter jets intercepted a US Navy E-P3 military reconnaissance aircraft flying in international airspace over the South China Sea.
 19 May – Indonesian military General Gatot Nurmantyo says they are considering conducting joint patrols with Malaysia and Philippines.
 20 May – The USS John Stennis Strike Group patrolling the South China Sea visits Philippines.
 21 May – China objects to the presence of four Indian ships in the South China Sea. The ships sailed on Wednesday for a two-and-a-half month long operational deployment to the SCS and North West Pacific. The ships will also take part in the Malabar exercise in the waters of the Philippines.
 23 May – US President Barack Obama visits Vietnam aiming to strengthen bilateral ties.
 23 May – A Chinese government bureau is planning to build a base station in the Spratly Islands to aid fishing boats in trouble and shorten the distance they need to travel.
 23 June – Indonesian President Joko Widodo sailed on a warship off Natuna islands to send a "clear message that the nation was very serious in its effort to protect its sovereignty".
 8 July – Philippine Foreign Secretary Perfecto Yasay said that the Philippines is willing to share the natural resources of West Philippine Sea to China.
 12 July – A tribunal of Permanent Court of Arbitration rejects Chinese Nine-dash line historical claims over South China Sea, concluding it has no legal basis at Philippines' request. The tribunal ruled against China in the Philippines v. China case, and unanimously award in favour of the Philippines.
 12 July – Beijing promptly rejects the tribunal ruling and called it "void".
 12 July – Ethiopia supports China's stance in the dispute.
 25 July 2016 – in Vientiane, Laos, ASEAN issued a joint statement regarding South China Sea dispute, which stated their commitment to ensure and promote the peace, stability and security in the region.

2020 
22 December - The PRC announced that guided missile destroyer John S McCain had been "expelled" after it “trespassed” into Chinese territorial waters close to the Spratly Islands.

2021 
11 July - During a meeting with Tajikistan's Foreign Minister Sirojiddin Muhriddin at the State Department in Washington, United States Secretary of State Antony Blinken stated, "an armed attack on Philippine armed forces, public vessels, or aircraft in the South China Sea would invoke US mutual defence commitments under Article IV of the 1951 US-Philippines Mutual Defence Treaty."
1 June - Malaysia scrambles its jets after 16 Chinese air force planes flying in tactical formation, entered its exclusive maritime zone close to the national airspace. On the next day, Malaysia summoned the Chinese ambassador on the issue, who denied the planes had entered the Malaysian maritime zone, explaining that it was just a "routine exercise".
4 June - A Chinese Coast Guard vessel has been reported to have encroached into the Malaysian waters off Miri near the Luconia Shoals.
30 July - The HMS Queen Elizabeth (R08) aircraft carrier task force sailed through disputed international waters in the South China Sea - and deployed ships in the region.
3 August - The German frigate Bayern set sail for South China Sea, making it the first German warship to go through the area since 2002.

References

timeline of territorial dispute
Politics-related lists